Desulfosarcina ovata is a bacterium from the genus of Desulfosarcina which has been isolated from seawater from an oil tank from Wilhelmshaven in Germany.

References

Desulfobacterales
Bacteria described in 2006